The South African National Rally Championship is a series of rallying events that has taken place each year since 1960. It was won eleven times by Sarel van der Merwe in the 1970s and 1980s and ten times by Serge Damseaux from 1989 to 2004. Toyota and Volkswagen vehicles have won the title of champion car in most years since 1998.

Now in its 61st consecutive year, the sport has been kept alive by privateers since 2017 with the decline of sponsorships and non involvement of manufacturers due to the world wide economic slow down. 

 

The South African Rally Championship has seen the exciting development of the new Africa Rally 1 (AR 1) Category car, competing in the NRC 1 class. A normal Aspirated 1600 Turbo, AWD car. New combers to this class is the Hyundai i 20, Mazda 2 and Toyota Starlet. These cars compete with the S2000 and old group N cars (Subaru's). A very exciting class to watch on every event. 

The NRC 1 class took over from the 1600 R2 Homologated cars as the official Championship class of the SA Championship. 

The Championship has been supported by CTRACK, TRACN4, MRF Tyres Africa, Fixedit Mobile, Mibern Medi-Call, Electrothread, Motorsport Technic 



South African Rally Champions

Champion Manufacturers

Championship Wins

Drivers

Co-Drivers

Manufacturers

Rally Wins

Drivers

Co-Drivers

Manufacturers

Season Results

1960

1961

1962

1963

1964

1965

1966

1967

1968

1969

1970

1971

1972

1973

1974

1975

1976

1977

1978

1979

1980

1981

1982

1983

1984

1985

1986

1987

1988

1989

1990

1991

1992

1993

 First South African crew home. Overall winners were Aldo Riva and Enrico Rivida in an Audi Quattro

Coupe.

1994

1995

1996

 First South African qualifying crew home. Overall winners were Sarel van der Merwe / Franz Boshoff in a Daewoo Cielo

1997

 First South African crew home. Rally was won overall by Robbie Head / Franz Boshoff in a Daewoo Cielo.

1998

1999

2000

2001

2002

2003

2004

2005

2006

2007

2008

2009

2010

2011

2012

2013

2014

2015

2016

2017

1 First R2 Class car home. Overall winners were Lee Rose / Elvene Coetzee in Classic Class Ford Escort

2 First R2 Class car home. Overall winners were Johnny Gemmell / Carl Peskin in Classic Class Porsche 911

3 First R2 Class car home. Overall winners were Theuns Joubert / Etienne Lourens in a S2000 Toyota Auris

2018

2019

2020

 Due to the COVID 19 Pandemic and the Disaster Management Legislation being implemented, the 2020 National Rally Championship had 3 events only.
 Each of the 2 days per event counted as an individual round. 
 The National Rally Championship adapted this formula as it proved to be very effective. Competitors are now able to re-enter a new event the following day if they did not complete the 1st day of the event. 

2021

2022

2023

References

Auto racing series in South Africa
Rally racing series
Rally